The 2008 French Figure Skating Championships took place between 7 and 9 December 2007 at the Palais des Sports in Megève. Skaters competed at the senior level in the disciplines of men's singles, ladies' singles, pair skating, ice dancing, and synchronized skating. The event was used to help determine the French team to the 2008 World Championships and the 2008 European Championships.

The compulsory dance was the Argentine Tango.

The junior synchronized event was held during this competition; junior and novice level competitions for the other disciplines were held separately.

Senior results

Men

Ladies

Pairs

Ice dancing
Five time medalists Nathalie Péchalat / Fabian Bourzat did not compete due to injury to him, so they would be well enough to compete the next week at the Grand Prix Final.

Synchronized

Junior results

Synchronized

External links
 CHAMPIONNAT DE FRANCE ELITE 2007
 2008 French Championships results (Archived)
 CHAMPIONNATS DE FRANCE JUNIORS ET SENIORS 2008

2007 in figure skating
French Figure Skating Championships, 2008
French Figure Skating Championships
2008 in French sport